Madhavaram Krishna Rao (born 19 February 1967) is an Indian politician belonging to the Telangana Rashtra Samithi. He represents Kukatpally Assembly constituency.

Early life

Madhavaram Krishna Rao was born in Kukatpally, Ranga Reddy District to Narayana Rao and Sakku Bai. Before joining TRS Mr. Rao was part of Telugu Desam Party from the Party inception.

Political career

Madhavaram Krishna Rao was elected from the Kukatpally Assembly constituency in 2014 at the age of 46 in the Telangana state from Telugu Desam Party.
He also served as Vice chairman GHMC Kukatpally.

Personal life 
Madhavaram Krishna Rao is married to Laxmi Bai and has two children. Mr. Rao has 2 younger brothers and 1 elder sister. Krishna Rao has good command over languages like Telugu, Hindi and English. He lives with his family at Kukatpally.

References

External links
 http://www.myneta.info/telangana2014/candidate.php?candidate_id=1662
 https://www.facebook.com/mkrkkpmla/

Telangana MLAs 2014–2018
People from Telangana
Telangana politicians
Telangana Rashtra Samithi politicians
Telugu people
Living people
1967 births
Telangana MLAs 2018–2023